Aostan French is the variety of French spoken in the Aosta Valley, Italy.

History 

The Aosta Valley was the first government authority to adopt Modern French as working language in 1536, three years before France itself. French has been the official language of the Aosta Valley since 1561, when it replaced Latin. In the 1861 census, the first held after the unification of Italy, 93% declared being Francophone; in 1921, the last census with a question about language found that 88% of the population was French-speaking. The suppression of all French-language schools and institutions and violence against French speakers during the forcible Italianisation campaign of the Fascist government irretrievably damaged the status of French in the region. Italian and French are nowadays the region's official languages and are used for the regional government's acts and laws, though Italian is much more widely spoken in everyday life, and French is mostly used by intellectuals and within cultural events. Though French was re-introduced as an official language after World War II, by 2003 just 0.99% reported speaking standard French natively. French remains widely known as a second language, but it is no longer spoken as part of daily life. In 2001, 75.41% of the population of Aosta Valley was French-speaking, 96.01% declared to know Italian, 55.77% Franco-Provençal, and 50.53% all of them. School education is delivered equally in both Italian and French so that everyone who went to school in Aosta Valley can speak French and Italian at least at a medium-high level.

Influences
Aostan French is characterized by terms adopted from the valdôtain dialect of Franco-Provençal and sometimes from Italian. In this sense, it is quite similar to Savoyard dialect and to valaisan dialect as spoken in Valais.

Lexicon

Numerals 
Unlike standard French of France, Aostan French uses:
 Seventy: septante 
 Eighty: huitante 
 Ninety: nonante

Meals 
 Breakfast = déjeuner
 Lunch = dinée or dîner
 Dinner = souper

Bibliography 
  Jean-Pierre Martin, Description lexicale du français parlé en Vallée d'Aoste, éd. Musumeci, Quart, 1984 (source)
  Alexis Bétemps, La langue française en Vallée d'Aoste de 1945 à nos jours T.D.L., Milan
  Jules Brocherel, Le Patois et la langue française en Vallée d'Aoste éd. V. Attinger, Neuchâtel
  La minorité linguistique valdôtaine, éd. Musumeci, Quart (1968).
  Rosellini Aldo, La francisation de la Vallée d'Aoste, dans Studi medio latini e volgari, vol. XVIII, 1958.
  Keller, Hans-Erich, Études linguistiques sur les parlers valdôtains, éd. A. Francke S.A., Berne, 1958.
  Schüle, Ernest, Histoire linguistique de la Vallée d'Aoste, dans Bulletin du Centre d'Études francoprovençales n° 22, Imprimerie Valdôtaine, Aoste, 1990. 
  Favre, Saverio, Histoire linguistique de la Vallée d'Aoste, dans Espace, temps et culture en Vallée d'Aoste, Imprimerie Valdôtaine, Aoste, 1996.
  François-Gabriel Frutaz, Les origines de la langue française en Vallée d'Aoste, Imprimerie Marguerettaz, Aoste, 1913.
  Mgr. Joseph-Auguste Duc, La langue française dans la Vallée d'Aoste, Saint-Maurice, 1915.
  Anselme Réan, La phase initiale de la guerre contre la langue française dans la Vallée d'Aoste, Ivrée, 1923.
 
  Bérard, Édouard, La langue française dans la Vallée d'Aoste : réponse à M. le chevalier Vegezzi-Ruscalla, Aoste, 1861 (rééd. 1962).
  Bétemps, Alexis, Les Valdôtains et leur langue, avant-propos d'Henri Armand, Imprimerie Duc, Aoste, 1979.

See also
 Valdôtain dialect

References

Languages of Italy
French dialects
Languages of Aosta Valley